David Pledger (born 1962) is an Australian artist and director.

Pledger has won several awards, including the Victorian Arts Centre's 1999 Kenneth Myer Medallion for the Performing Arts, and in 2000 the A$25,000 Sidney Myer performing arts award.,

He established the Collaboration Project between the Australia Council for the Arts and the IETM. In 2004 he directed two shows in the Melbourne Festival.

Pledger's work is featured in Melbourne Now Limited Edition (NGV, Australia, 2013); Multimedia Performance (Macmillan, UK, 2012) and Making Contemporary Theatre (MUP, UK, 2010).

He works as an advocate for artists. In 2008 he attended the 2020 Summit as a delegate in the Creative Australia stream.

References

External links 

Australian artists
Living people
Year of birth missing (living people)